Flemming Delfs (born September 7, 1951) is a former Danish badminton player who was world no. 1 in 1977. He won the All England Championship, the European and the World Championship in the 1970s.

Career

Delfs is especially noteworthy for winning men's singles at the first IBF World Championships held in Malmö, Sweden in 1977. He dominated that same 1976/1977 season by winning nearly all other noteworthy tournaments, including the All-England Championships. Delfs won three consecutive European men's singles titles in 1976, 1978, and 1980. He played on all four Danish Thomas Cup (men's international) teams between 1972 and 1982, two of which (1973, 1979) reached the championship round before losing to Indonesia. Tall, with an elegant style and powerful backhand, Delfs was a highly impressive player at his best, but typically   had difficulty in the  hot, humid conditions he encountered in the Far East.

Later life
After ending his active career, Delfs  became CEO and co-owner of Patrick Skandinavia A/S the Danish distributor for Patrick.

Achievements

World Championships 
Men's singles

Men's doubles

World Cup 
Men's singles

European Championships 
Men's singles

International tournaments 

Men's singles

Men's doubles

Mixed doubles

References

External links 
Flemming Delfs's Profile - Badminton.dk 

1951 births
Living people
Danish male badminton players